The Fijian Navy was created when Fiji ratified the recently created United Nations Convention on Laws of the Sea.

Fiji was provided three Pacific Forum patrol vessels, designed and built by Australia, so its Pacific Forum neighbours could police their own sovereignty.

Captain Humphrey Tawake is the current Chief officer of the Fijian Navy.

Fleet 
 , Pacific Forum patrol vessel, in use since May 1994
 , Pacific Forum patrol vessel, in use since May 1994
 , Pacific Forum patrol vessel, in use since October 1995
 , oceanic survey vessel donated by South Korea, in use since 2019
 , hydrographic survey vessel donated by China, in use since 2019, Fiji's largest vessel with a crew complement of about 30
 , the first of two Guardian-class patrol vessels, to be built in Australia

References

Military units and formations of Fiji
Fiji